Bristol Eastern High School is a public high school in Bristol, Connecticut, United States which was opened in 1959. It has an enrollment of 1,367 students in grades 9-12. As of 2019, its principal is Michael Higgins.  Its mascot is the Lancer and the school colors are blue and gray.

Notable alumni

Tom Shopay, (Class of 1963), former Major League Baseball player for New York Yankees and Baltimore Orioles

References

External links
 

Buildings and structures in Bristol, Connecticut
Schools in Hartford County, Connecticut
Educational institutions established in 1959
Public high schools in Connecticut
1959 establishments in Connecticut